Gülşen is a Turkish given name for females (originally from Persian Golshan/گلشن, means place of flowers). People named Gülşen include:

 Gülşen Aktaş (born 1957), Turkish schoolteacher and political scientist
 Gülşen Bayraktar, Turkish pop singer
 Gülşen Bubikoğlu, Turkish actress
 Gülşen Degener, Turkish carom billiards player

See also
 Gulshan (disambiguation)

Turkish feminine given names